A well drink or rail drink is an alcoholic beverage served using the lower-cost liquors stored within easy reach of the bartender in the counter "speed rail", "speed rack", or "well".

In any given establishment, the rail/well liquors available may also be known as the "house pours", "house brands", "house spirits", "pour brands", or "proprietary spirits".

Well drinks differ from "call" drinks in that the former are offered when a customer does not specify a particular brand of liquor when ordering a mixed drink.

The actual liquors used by a drinking establishment will vary. A bartender's well may include at least one variety each of gin, rum, whiskey, vodka, bourbon, tequila, triple sec, and vermouth.

Some establishments that cater to higher-end clientele or wish to project an aura of luxury choose premium brands to be their well liquors (thus offering a "premium well").

Call and top-shelf 
A rail or well drink is usually served when a customer does not specify that a particular brand of liquor be used. For example, a customer order for a "Scotch and soda" would lead the bartender to use a rail/well Scotch whisky and would be priced as a well drink, whereas ordering "Glenlivet and soda" would be a call drink. Another example would be a "Jack and Coke" rather than a "Whiskey and Coke."

Call liquors are known as such because the customer "calls" or requests a particular brand of liquor.

Certain expensive brand-name liquors are not considered or priced as call, but are instead known as "top-shelf" liquors, both from their placement on the shelves and from their price relative to the other liquors available.

References 

Cocktails
Lists of cocktails
Bartending